Nuno can refer to

Nuno (given name)
Nuno Espirito Santo, football manager
Nuno Tavares, football player
Nuño (given name)
Nuno felting, a fabric felting technique
Nuno, meaning "ancestor" in Philippine languages, usually in reference to ancestral anito spirits
Nuno sa punso, a nature spirit (anito) of anthills with the appearance of an old man in Philippine folklore